ESC Planegg-Würmtal, nicknamed the Planegg Penguins, are an ice hockey club in the German Women's Ice Hockey League (DFEL). They are based in Planegg, in the Würmtal near Munich, and, play at the Eisstadion Miesbach in Miesbach, which they share with the TEV Miesbach of the men's Eishockey-Bayernliga. ESC Planegg have won the German Championship in women's ice hockey eight times, three more wins than any other team in league history; they have also won seven German Championship silver medals and three bronze medals.

History 
The ESC Planegg was founded on 6 April 1990 and initially took part in the game operations of the Bavarian state league. After promotion, however, the partnership was dissolved and ESC Planegg continued playing alone, although the club's secondary team played together with ERSC Ottobrunn in both the 1994–95 and 1998–99 seasons. In the 1996–97 and 1997–98 seasons, the second team played as SG Planegg/München to enable players from Munich to participate.

After the team failed to qualify for the intermediate round in the 2004–05 DFEL season, they took part in the relegation round. Under these unusual circumstances, ESC Planegg was awarded their first German Cup victory.

In the 2005–06 season, the team managed to qualify for the intermediate round, where they claimed fourth seed in the final tournament. ESC Planegg lost in the final against OSC Berlin and became runners-up. In the 2006–07 season, the German Champions were not determined in a cup tournament for the first time. In the end, the ESC Planegg reached second place in the table and were runner-up again. At the newly introduced DEB Cup tournament, the ESC Planegg lost to EC Bergkamener Bären in the penalty shoot-out in the final and were again able to claim second place.

In the 2007–08 season, the club won the German Championship for the first time without losing a point, with a 13-point lead over second-placed OSC Berlin. In the DEB Cup, however, the Penguins narrowly lost to OSC 3:4 in the preliminary round and won the match for third place 7–0 against EC Bergkamen. The ESC Planegg started the 2008–09 season as German Champions in the IIHF European Women Champions Cup, but did not make it beyond the preliminary round. The team also took part in the Elite Women's Hockey League for the first time, which was held parallel to the Bundesliga, and finished third behind HC Slavia Praha and OSC Berlin.

In the 2009–10 season, ESC Planegg took part in the EWHL alongside the Bundesliga, this time as the only German representative, and won it to become the first German team to claim the EWHL Championship after defeating the Ravens Salzburg in the final.

ESC Planegg finished the 2019–20 Bundesliga regular season in first place and reached the play-off final against ECDC Memmingen after beating the Eisbären Juniors Berlin in the semifinals. After the first final game on 7 March 2020 (ECDC Memmingen 2–4 ESC Planegg), the German Ice Hockey Federation (DEB) stopped further game operations in all leagues on 11 March 2020 in response to the COVID-19 pandemic.

In the 2020–21 season, the ESC Planegg qualified for the DFEL Final Four tournament, where they defeated ECDC Memmingen 3-2 in the semifinals and Eisbären Juniors Berlin 4-1 in the final to win the club's eighth German Championship in women's ice hockey. The EWHL Supercup with 12 teams from Europe and Kazakhstan was not played to the end due to the COVID-19 pandemic.

Home venues
There are no artificial ice rinks in Planegg, so the team has used a number of training and playing venues in the region for home games. Previous venues include the Eissporthalle Grafing in Grafing and the Eisstadion Bad Tölz in Bad Tölz.

Team honours

German Championship 

  DFEL Champions (8): 2007–08, 2010–11, 2011–12, 2012–13, 2013–14, 2014–15, 2016–17, 2020–21
  Runners-up (7): 2005–06, 2006–07, 2008–09, 2009–10, 2015–16, 2017–18, 2018–19
  Third Place: (3): 1998–99, 2001–02, 2002–03

German Cup 

  DEB Cup Champions (4): 2005, 2010, 2012, 2015
  Runners-up (6): 2007, 2011, 2013, 2014, 2016, 2017
  Third Place: (3): 2008, 2009, 2018

EWHL Championship 
  Elite Women’s Hockey League Champions (1): 2009–10
  Third Place (2): 2008–09, 2010–11

EWHL Super Cup 

  EWHL Super Cup Champions (2): 2011–12, 
  Runners-up (2): 2014–15, 2019
  Third Place: (4): 2012–13, 2015–16, 2017–18, 2018–19

References

External links 
  

European Women's Hockey League teams
German Women's Hockey League teams
Ice hockey teams in Germany
1991 establishments in Germany
Planegg